Intensification may refer to:

 Image intensification by image intensifier
 Rapid intensification, a meteorological condition that occurs when a tropical cyclone intensifies dramatically in a short period of time
 Sustainable intensification in intensive farming
 Urban intensification, a concept in urban density
 Water cycle intensification, a development taking place due to climate change